Heraclea or Herakleia, also transliterated as Heracleia, was a town of ancient Aeolis. It was opposite to Hecatonnesi. This town and the neighbouring Coryphantis are called villages of the Mytilenaeans. The town may also have carried the names Elateia, Idale, and Itale during Roman times.
 
Its site is located near Ayvalık, Asiatic Turkey.

References

Populated places in ancient Aeolis
Former populated places in Turkey
Ionian colonies